Lucinda Gaye "Cindy" McLeish (born 26 April 1962) is an Australian politician, and has been a member of the Victorian Legislative Assembly since 2010, representing Seymour until 2014 and Eildon thereafter.

McLeish was born and raised in Yea, in the north of the electorate, growing up on the family farm. She said her family had been in the area since the early 1840s. Her mother had the Railway Hotel (now the Peppercorn) in Yea for many years.

After completing high school in Yea, McLeish attended Melbourne University and completed a Bachelor of Science and a Diploma of Education, this was followed by a Graduate Diploma in counselling, after which she was able to register as a Psychologist.

In 2001, McLeish completed an MBA from Melbourne Business School, which she studied part-time while juggling work and raising a family. She was CEO of Women's Golf Victoria for many years, and worked in the area of organisational effectiveness and leadership capability at Right Management prior to becoming elected.

McLeish had just 18 days as Liberal candidate for the 2010 state election after replacing Mike Laker, who stepped down at the end of October citing personal reasons.

Following the Napthine Coalition Government's defeat at the 2014 Victorian State Election, McLeish was appointed Shadow Assistant Minister for Communities & Volunteers.

In December 2018, McLeish was elected unopposed as Deputy Leader of the Victorian Liberal Party taking on roles as Shadow Minister for Education, Youth Affairs and Regional Cities. She was replaced by David Southwick in September 2021.

She is married to former Test cricketer, Jeff Moss.

References

External links
 Parliamentary voting record of Cindy McLeish at Victorian Parliament Tracker

1968 births
Living people
Members of the Victorian Legislative Assembly
Liberal Party of Australia members of the Parliament of Victoria
University of Melbourne alumni
21st-century Australian politicians
21st-century Australian women politicians
Women members of the Victorian Legislative Assembly